South Water Street Historic District is a national historic district located at Martinsburg, Berkeley County, West Virginia. It encompasses 30 contributing buildings and one contributing site, related to residential, commercial, and economic development along the Tuscarora Creek. Notable buildings include: the Edison Electric Illumination Company of Martinsburg building; dwellings along South Water Street at 104–106, 108, 119, 120, 200, 202, 208, 216, and 308; rowhouses at 222, 224, and 226; the O'Hara-Martin House (c. 1795); the Alburtis House; the South Water Street Stone House (bef. 1779); the Martinsburg Steam Laundry Company building; and Martinsburg Gas Company Complex (c. 1872–1905).  Also located in the district is the separately listed General Adam Stephen House (c. 1772–1798).

It was listed on the National Register of Historic Places in 1980.

References

Commercial buildings on the National Register of Historic Places in West Virginia
Federal architecture in West Virginia
Georgian architecture in West Virginia
Historic districts in Martinsburg, West Virginia
Houses on the National Register of Historic Places in West Virginia
Stick-Eastlake architecture in West Virginia
Houses in Martinsburg, West Virginia
Historic districts on the National Register of Historic Places in West Virginia